Theodotus II also known as Theodosius , (? – October 1154) was a 12th-century clergyman who served as Patriarch of Constantinople from 1151 until 1153.

Theodotus was an Abbot at the Monastery of the Resurrection in Constantinople. His two-year reign as Patriarch of Constantinople was uneventful, and he died in office. He was Patriarch during the rule of Byzantine emperor Manuel I Comnenus.

A letter from the Metropolitan of Ephesus, George Tornikes, to the Metropolitan of Athens, George Bourtzes, notes how Tornikes was nearly lynched by the "rude mass of the clergy of Hagia Sophia" when he objected to their plan to economise on Theodotus' funeral expenses. The desire to deny him the full measure of state funeral may have been due to accusations that the Patriarch was a Bogomil, an accusation leveled by the Patriarch-elect of Antioch, Soterichos Panteugenos, who used the dead Theodotus' "black and withered hand" as evidence of his heresy. John Kinnamos notes only that Theodotus was "practiced in ascetic discipline."

References

1070s births
1153 deaths
12th-century patriarchs of Constantinople
Officials of Manuel I Komnenos